Silva Reinaldo Ribeiro (born June 8, 1981) is a Brazilian footballer currently playing for FC Andelsbuch. He also holds Austrian citizenship.

References

1981 births
Living people
Brazilian footballers
SC Austria Lustenau players
SC Rheindorf Altach players

Association football midfielders